Romana Trajkovska (born 6 May 1993) is a Swiss–Macedonian footballer who plays as a midfielder for Nationalliga A club FC Rapperswil-Jona and the North Macedonia national team. She has been a member of the Switzerland national under-19 team.

References

1993 births
Living people
Women's association football midfielders
Macedonian women's footballers
North Macedonia women's international footballers
Swiss women's footballers
Swiss people of Macedonian descent
Swiss Women's Super League players
FC Rapperswil-Jona players